Natchathira Jannal is an Indian Tamil language talk show on Puthuyugam TV. The first season of the show began airing on 27 October 2013, and ended on 3 August 2014, after airing 39 episodes. The second season has been started from 25 August 2017 and ended on 1 November 2017, after airing 10 episodes. The show hosted by Tamil actress Sangeetha Krish.

The third season has been started from 29 July 2018 and airs on every Sunday at 11:00 am (IST) and Hosted by Singer Divya.

Overview
The show will feature personalities from the Tamil film industry (Actor, producer, Singers, television presenter, director) from Tamil Nadu who will talk about their life.

Seasons overview

List of Episodes

Season 01

Season 02

Season 03

References

External links
 Puthuyugam TV official website
 Puthuyugam TV on YouTube
 Natchathira Jannal Talk Show Full Episodes

Puthuyugam TV television series
Tamil-language talk shows
2010s Tamil-language television series
2013 Tamil-language television series debuts
Tamil-language television shows
2014 Tamil-language television series endings
2017 Tamil-language television series debuts
2014 Tamil-language television seasons
2017 Tamil-language television seasons
2017 Tamil-language television series endings
2018 Tamil-language television seasons
2018 Tamil-language television series debuts